Spectre, specter or the spectre may refer to:

Religion and spirituality
 Vision (spirituality)
 Apparitional experience
 Ghost

Arts and entertainment

Film and television
 Spectre (1977 film), a made-for-television film produced and written by Gene Roddenberry
 Specters (film), a 1987 horror film starring Donald Pleasence
 Spectre (1996 film), an American-Irish horror film
 Spectres (film), a 2004 supernatural drama
 Specter (2005 film), a Japanese tokusatsu film
 DC Showcase: The Spectre, a 2010 short animated film
 Spectre (2015 film), a James Bond film
 Specter (Battlestar Galactica), a Cylon in the original Battlestar Galactica television series
 Harvey Specter, a character from the TV series Suits
 Kamen Rider Specter, a character from the tokusatsu series Kamen Rider Ghost
 The Spectres, the main protagonists of the animated TV series Star Wars Rebels

Music
 Spectre (musician), alias of producer and rapper Skiz Fernando
 The Spectre (rapper) (born 1986), British
 Akhenaton (rapper) (born 1968), French hip hop artist who uses Spectre as one of his aliases
 Spectres (album), 1977, by Blue Öyster Cult
 Spectre (Laibach album), 2014
 "Spectre" (Radiohead song), by the English band Radiohead
 "Spectre" (Alan Walker song), 2015
 "The Spectre" (song), 2017, by Norwegian record producer and DJ Alan Walker
 "Spectre", a song by Christian Death
 "Spectres", a song from the Avantasia album The Mystery of Time
 "Spectres", a song from the God Is an Astronaut album Ghost Tapes #10
 Spectre: Original Motion Picture Soundtrack, from the James Bond movie

Literature
 SPECTRE, an evil organisation in the James Bond novels and films
 Spectre (His Dark Materials), ghostly beings in Philip Pullman's fantasy novel trilogy
 Spectre (novel), a 1998 Star Trek novel by William Shatner
 Spectre (DC Comics character), any of several DC Comics characters
 Silk Spectre, a DC Comics character
 The Specter (novel), a 1938 novel by Maxim Gorki
 The Specters, creatures in the manga Saint Seiya and its sequel

Video games
 Spectre (1982 video game), released in 1982
 Spectre (1991 video game), 1991, for the Macintosh computer
 Spectre, an elite intelligence and military unit in the series Mass Effect
 Specter, a villain in the series Ape Escape
 Spectre, a vehicle in the Halo series
 Mercurial - The Spectre, a hero in the game mod Defense of the Ancients and its sequel
 Spectre, a necropolis unit in the Heroes of Might and Magic series
 Spectre, a character/vehicle in the first and second installments of the Twisted Metal series
 Specter, a character in SOCOM U.S. Navy SEALs series
 Spectre team, a covert ops military unit in the PlayStation 3 game Resistance 2
 Spectre, callsign of the player character in MechWarrior 4: Mercenaries
 Spectre, a cloaking sniper unit in StarCraft II: Wings of Liberty
 Master Spectre, a character from the game Adventures in the Magic Kingdom
 BRD-01 Spectre, an artificial intelligence controlled robotic unit in Titanfall
 Spectre, callsign of a multiplayer character in Call of Duty: Black Ops III
 Spectres, a type of monsters from the MMORPG game The Secret World
Specter Knight, a boss in Shovel Knight

Other
 Spectre (Blake), one of the elements of humans in William Blake's mythology
 Spectre (Dungeons & Dragons), an undead creature

Military and aircraft
 USS Specter (AM-306), a minesweeper which served in World War II
 Lockheed AC-130H Spectre, an American gunship aircraft
 de Havilland Spectre, a 1950s rocket engine intended for Royal Air Force aircraft
 Spectre M4, an Italian submachine gun
 Specter Aircraft, an American aircraft manufacturer
 Specter Aircraft Specter II, an American homebuilt aircraft design
 McDonnell Douglas F-4 Phantom II, was briefly assigned the name "F-110A Spectre" by USAF, but it was never used in practice

Places
 Spectre (fictional town), an abandoned movie set located in Alabama, created for the film Big Fish
 Specter Range, a mountain range in Nevada, US
 The Spectre (Antarctica), a rock spire in the Queen Maud Mountains

Technology
 HP Spectre, a Hewlett-Packard computer
 Spectre (security vulnerability), a computer security vulnerability
 Spectre Circuit Simulator, for analog integrated circuits
 Spectre GCR, an add-on cartridge to run Macintosh software on an Atari ST computer

Other uses
 Specter (surname)
 Spectre (political party), in the United Kingdom
 Spectre R42, a British sports car by Spectre Supersports and Spectre Motors

See also
 Brocken spectre, the magnified shadow of an observer cast upon clouds opposite of the Sun's direction
 Spectre-hound, a phantom black hound in Manx folklore, for example Moddey Dhoo
 Spector (disambiguation) (includes Spektor)
 Spectra (disambiguation)
 Spectrum (disambiguation)